Lithuania, following its independence from the Soviet Union, made its Paralympic Games début at the 1992 Summer Paralympics in Barcelona, with a delegation of four athletes in track and field. This first delegation was notably successful, with all four athletes winning at least one medal, and female runner Sigita Kriaučiūnienė sweeping up four medals (three silver and a bronze). Kriaučiūnienė was also part of Lithuania's two person delegation for its first participation in the Winter Paralympics, in 1994. Lithuania has taken part in every subsequent edition of the Summer Paralympics, but has not returned to the Winter Games since 1994.

Medal tallies
Lithuanians have won a total of thirty Paralympic medals (of which four gold, eleven silver and fifteen bronze), making it the most successful of the Baltic states. All these medals have been won at the Summer Games. Most of them have been won in track and field, but Lithuanians have also had some success in other sports. Jonas Stoškus has twice won bronze in judo (in 1996 and 2004), while Kęstutis Skučas won a silver medal in swimming in 2004, and the Lithuanian men's goalball team won silver in both 2000 and 2008.

Summer Paralympics

Winter Paralympics

Medals by sport

Medalists

See also
 Lithuania at the Olympics

References